Darren Waterston (born 1965) is an American artist who is mainly known for his ethereal paintings.

Early life and education
Waterson was born in California in 1965. He received his BFA at the Otis Art Institute in Los Angeles. From 1986-87 he studied at the Akademie der Kunst, Berlin, Germany and Fachhochschule für Kunst, Münster, Germany.

Works

In 2011, Waterston finished Forest Eater, which comprised approximately fifty paintings and works on paper and four site-specific sculptures. The largest of the sculptures is "Wrath", a forbidding eighteen-foot long vertical lava formation, which hung from the museum's ceiling. The project was conceived specifically for the Honolulu Contemporary Art Museum.

Filthy Lucre

Filthy Lucre presents a dystopian version of The Peacock Room, James McNeill Whistler's 1876 decorative masterpiece. Waterston's work, like The Peacock Room, probes and considers the conflation of painting, architecture, patronage, and artistic ego. The project was conceived specifically for the Massachusetts Museum of Contemporary Art and first exhibited in 2014. In May 2015, it opened at the Arthur M. Sackler Gallery, while The Peacock Room of the adjoining Freer Gallery of Art undergoes renovation.

Critical reception

Of The Flowering: The Fourfold Sense, DeWitt Cheng wrote: "Darren Waterston’s older paintings were lyrical misty landscapes with silhouetted flora and fauna. His newer works, symbolist abstractions, become mindscapes in which ambiguous transparent forms arise, float, flutter, and sink amid mist, clouds, swirls, drips, and vermicular coils of brushstrokes; each image with its poetic cycles of life represents the cosmos as 'a divine chaos.'"

Sue Taylor wrote: "Adept at a myriad of fluid effects, Waterston is a virtuosic colorist as well, enlivening the palest mauve and power-blue fogs with passages of burning orange or hot pink. In these apocalyptic dreams, he imagines flashing, otherworldly realms at the brink of consciousness."

Of Waterston's exhibition Last Days, Regina Hackett wrote: "If there's a more imitated painter in America than Darren Waterston, I can't imagine who it would be. Waterston's silky rot and colored goo are gorgeous. They imply a world in which the air has evolved to carry a weightless and more sophisticated kind of consciousness. Working in oils on panel, Waterston creates worlds inside the world, what Gerald Manley Hopkins' described in God's Grandeur: 'Because the Holy Ghost over the bent/ World broods with warm breast and with ah! bright wings.' In the current exhibit, titled 'Last Days,' Waterston merges beauty with blight. He paints starlight inside a cave, roots in the air, and minerals dissolving into liquids. 'Fallen' features a hollowed-out and free-floating tree trunk. White orchids with stale, shadowed edges hang suspended under fragments of enameled blue sky."

Selected books and catalogues

2007 Cathy Kimball, “Apocalypse Now”, San Jose Institute of Contemporary Art, catalog.
2006 David Pagel, Galerie Jean-Luc and Takako Richard, catalog.
2003 Jacquelynn Baas, “Material, Immaterial: Waterston’s Ghosts,” Charles Cowles Gallery, catalog.
2001 Benjamin Weissman, “Story of Waterston,” Darren Waterston (monograph), St. Ann’s Press, Los Angeles.
2000 Tim Burton, Kohn Turner Gallery, catalog.
2000 Carmine Iannaccone, “An Anatomy of Beguilement: Style in the Work of Darren Waterston,” Kohn Turner Gallery, catalog.
1999 Peter Clothier, “In the Reeds and the Rushes,” The Fresno Art Museum, catalog.
1997 Noriko Gamblin, “Darren Waterston,” Charles Cowles Gallery, catalog.
1992 Noriko Gamblin, “Elegies,” Long Beach Museum of Art, catalog.
2012 DC Moore Gallery, "Remote Futures (exhibition catalogue), DC Moore Gallery, 2012

References

External links

Darren Waterston – Inman Gallery

1965 births
American installation artists
Living people
20th-century American painters
American male painters
21st-century American painters
21st-century American male artists
Otis College of Art and Design alumni
Painters from California
American contemporary painters
20th-century American male artists